Gymnelia pitthea is a moth of the subfamily Arctiinae. It was described by Herbert Druce in 1896. It is found in Peru.

References

 

Gymnelia
Moths described in 1896